Juan Goytisolo Gay (6 January 1931 – 4 June 2017) was a Spanish poet, essayist, and novelist. He lived in Marrakesh from 1997 until his death in 2017.
He was considered Spain's greatest living writer at the beginning of the 21st century, yet he had lived abroad since the 1950s.
On 24 November 2014 he was awarded the Cervantes Prize, the most prestigious literary award in the Spanish-speaking world.

Background
Juan Goytisolo was born to an upper class family. He claimed that this level of status, accompanied by the cruelties of his great-grandfather and the miserliness of his grandfather (discovered through the reading of old family letters and documents), was a major reason for his joining the Communist party in his youth. His father was imprisoned by the Republican government during the Spanish Civil War, while his mother, Julia Gay, was killed in the first Francoist air raid of Barcelona in 1938. He attended a Jesuit school in Barcelona after the Civil War, where he began writing fiction as a teenager. He later attended law school at the University of Madrid and the University of Barcelona, but left without earning a degree.

Career
After law studies, Goytisolo published his first novel, The Young Assassins, in 1954. In 1956 he performed six months of military service in Mataró, which inspired some of his early stories. His deep opposition to Francisco Franco led him into exile in Paris later that same year, where he worked as a reader for Gallimard. In the early 1960s, he was a friend of Guy Debord. From 1969 to 1975 he worked as a literature professor in universities in California, Boston, and New York. Breaking with the realism of his earlier novels, he published Marks of Identity (1966), Count Julian (1970), and Juan the Landless (1975). During his tenure as a professor he also worked on his controversial Spanish translation of the works of José María Blanco White, which he published in part as a critique of Francoist Spain. As with all his works, they were banned in Spain until after Franco's death.

In 2012, Goytisolo confirmed that he was finished writing novels, saying he had nothing more to write and that it was better he kept quiet. He continued, however, to publish essays and some poetry.

Count Julian (1970, 1971, 1974) takes up, in an act of outspoken defiance, the side of Julian, count of Ceuta, a man traditionally castigated as the ultimate traitor in Spanish history. In Goytisolo's own words, he imagines "the destruction of Spanish mythology, its Catholicism and nationalism, in a literary attack on traditional Spain." He identifies himself "with the great traitor who opened the door to Arab invasion." The narrator in this novel, an exile in North Africa, rages against his beloved Spain, forming an obsessive identification with the fabled Count Julian, dreaming that, in a future invasion, the ethos and myths central to Hispanic identity will be totally destroyed.

Family
Goytisolo was married to the publisher, novelist and screenwriter , whom he met in Paris in the 1950s. Lange was related to Emmanuel Berl and the philosopher Henri Bergson. Goytisolo and Lange had something of an open relationship, and he slept with men but "love[d] only Monique". They married in 1978 and lived together until she died in 1996. After her death, he was noted as saying their once-shared Paris apartment had become like a tomb. In 1997 he moved to Marrakesh, where he died in 2017.

His brothers José Agustín Goytisolo (1928–1999) and Luis Goytisolo (1935) were also writers.

Works

Fiction
The Young Assassins (Juegos de manos) (1954) 
Duelo en el Paraíso (1955)
El mañana efímero (trilogy)
El circo (1957)
Fiestas (1958)
La Resaca (1958)
Para vivir aquí (1960)
La isla (1961)
La Chanca (1962)
Fin de fiesta. Tentativas de interpretación de una historia amorosa (1962)
Álvaro Mendiola (trilogy)
Marks of Identity (Señas de identidad, 1966)
Count Julian (Reivindicación del conde don Julián, 1970)
Juan the Landless (Juan sin Tierra, 1975)
Makbara (1980)
Paisajes después de la batalla (1985)
Las virtudes del pájaro solitario (1988)
La cuarentena (1991)
El sitio de los sitios (1995)
Las semanas del jardín (1997)
The Marx Family Saga (1999), (La saga de los Marx, 1993) 
State of Siege (2002)
Telón de boca (2003)
A Cock-Eyed Comedy (2005) (Carajicomedia, 2000)
Exiled from Almost Everywhere (El exiliado de aquí y allá, 2008)

Essays
Problemas de la novela (1959). Literature.
Furgón de cola (1967).
España y los españoles (1979). History and politics.
Crónicas sarracinas (1982).
El bosque de las letras (1995). Literature.
Disidencias (1996). Literature.
De la Ceca a la Meca. Aproximaciones al mundo islámico (1997).
Cogitus interruptus (1999).
El peaje de la vida (2000). With Sami Nair.
Landscapes of War: From Sarajevo to Chechnya (2000).
El Lucernario: la pasión crítica de Manuel Azaña (2004).

Others
Campos de Níjar (1954). Travels, journalism.
Pueblo en marcha. Tierras de Manzanillo. Instantáneas de un viaje a Cuba (1962). Travels, journalism.
Obra inglesa de Blanco White (1972). Editor.
Coto vedado (1985). Memoir.
En los reinos de taifa (1986). Memoir.
Alquibla (1988). TV script for TVE.
Estambul otomano (1989). Travels.
Aproximaciones a Gaudí en Capadocia (1990). Travels.
Cuaderno de Sarajevo (1993). Travels, journalism.
Argelia en el vendaval (1994). Travels, journalism.
Paisajes de guerra con Chechenia al fondo (1996). Travels, journalism.
Lectura del espacio en Xemaá-El-Fná (1997). Illustrated by Hans Werner Geerdts.
El universo imaginario (1997).
Diálogo sobre la desmemoria, los tabúes y el olvido (2000). Conversation with Günter Grass.
Paisajes de guerra: Sarajevo, Argelia, Palestina, Chechenia (2001).
Pájaro que ensucia su propio nido (2001). Articles.
Memorias (2002).
España y sus Ejidos (2003).
Cinema Eden: Essays from the Muslim Mediterranean (Eland, 2003) – an English-language translation of several of his essays

Literary prizes
1985: Europalia Prize for Literature
1993: Nelly Sachs Prize
2002: Octavio Paz Prize
2004: Juan Rulfo Prize for Latin American and Caribbean Literature
2008: National Prize for Spanish Literature
2010: Premio Don Quijote
2012: Prix Formentor
2014: Miguel de Cervantes Prize

References

External links
  Official Page
 "Scourge of the New Spain", an article on Goytisolo from The Guardian
 Interview with Goytisolo from the Center for Book Culture
 Juan Goytisolo at the complete review – bibliography, evaluation, and links
 Fernanda Eberstadt, The Anti-Orientalist, The New York Times Magazine article, April 16, 2006

 Juan Goytisolo, Voltaire and Islam, El País, 4 May 2006
 Juan Goytisolo, La historia se escibe en la plaza El País, 14 February 2011

1931 births
2017 deaths
Bisexual writers
People from Marrakesh
Spanish essayists
20th-century Spanish novelists
21st-century Spanish novelists
Spanish male novelists
Spanish poets
Writers from Barcelona
Spanish LGBT poets
Spanish LGBT novelists
Male essayists
Spanish male poets
20th-century essayists
21st-century essayists
20th-century Spanish male writers
21st-century Spanish male writers
Spanish expatriates in Morocco
Spanish expatriates in France
Bisexual academics
Premio Cervantes winners